Three Men in a Boat is a 1956 British CinemaScope colour comedy film directed by Ken Annakin. The film received mixed reviews, but was a commercial success.

Plot
The film is set in the Edwardian era. Harris, J, and George want to get away from it all. They decide to go on holiday boating up the River Thames to Oxford, taking with them their dog Montmorency. George is happy to get away from his job at the bank. Harris is glad to get away from Mrs. Willis, who is pressing him to marry her daughter Clara. And 'J' is more than anxious to take a holiday from his wife, Ethelbertha. George meets three girls, Sophie Clutterbuck and sisters Bluebell and Primrose Porterhouse, who are also taking a ride up the river, and he hopes to see them again. The travellers get into various complications with the weather, the river, the boat, food, the Hampton Court Maze, tents, rain and locks. They do connect with the girls again, and when things appear to be becoming interesting for the men, Mrs. Willis and her daughter and Ethelbertha show up, and things become even more interesting.

Cast
 Laurence Harvey - George
 Jimmy Edwards - Harris
 David Tomlinson - Jerome “J”
 Shirley Eaton - Sophie Clutterbuck
 Jill Ireland - Bluebell Porterhouse
 Lisa Gastoni - Primrose Porterhouse
 Martita Hunt - Mrs Willis
 Joan Haythorne - Mrs Porterhouse
 Campbell Cotts - Ambrose Porterhouse
 Adrienne Corri - Clara Willis
 Noelle Middleton - Ethelbertha
 Charles Lloyd-Pack - Mr Quilp
 Robertson Hare - Photographer
 A. E. Matthews - 1st Cricketer
 Miles Malleson - 2nd Cricketer
 Ernest Thesiger - Umpire
 Hal Osmond - Cabbie

Reception
The film was the 12th most popular movie at the British box office in 1957.

According to Kinematograph Weekly the film was "in the money" at the British box office in 1957.

References

External links 

1956 films
1950s historical comedy films
CinemaScope films
British historical comedy films
Films directed by Ken Annakin
Films scored by John Addison
Films set in the 1900s
Films set in London
Films set on boats
Seafaring films
Films based on works by Jerome K. Jerome
1956 comedy films
1950s English-language films
1950s British films